was a Japanese football player. He played for Japan national team.

Club career
Tokita was born in Kobe on June 24, 1925. After graduating from Kwansei Gakuin University, he joined Tanabe Pharmaceutical in 1950. He retired in 1959. He also played for Kwangaku Club was consisted of his alma mater Kwansei Gakuin University players and graduates. He won Emperor's Cup 4 times as member of Kwangaku Club.

National team career
In March 1951, Tokita was selected Japan national team for Japan team first game after World War II, 1951 Asian Games. At this competition, on March 7, he debuted against Iran. He also played at 1954 Asian Games. In November 1956, he was selected Japan for 1956 Summer Olympics and he played as captain. He played 12 games and scored 2 goals for Japan until 1959.

On March 5, 2004, Tokita died of esophageal cancer in Hyogo Prefecture at the age of 78. In 2006, he was selected for the Japan Football Hall of Fame.

National team statistics

Honours
Japan
Asian Games Bronze medal: 1951

References

External links

 
 Japan National Football Team Database
Japan Football Hall of Fame at Japan Football Association

1925 births
2004 deaths
Kwansei Gakuin University alumni
Association football people from Hyōgo Prefecture
Japanese footballers
Japan international footballers
Tanabe Mitsubishi Pharma SC players
Olympic footballers of Japan
Footballers at the 1956 Summer Olympics
Asian Games medalists in football
Asian Games bronze medalists for Japan
Footballers at the 1951 Asian Games
Medalists at the 1951 Asian Games
Footballers at the 1954 Asian Games
Association football forwards